The Flood Control Act of 1946 was passed by the United States Congress on July 24, 1946; to authorize 123 projects including several dams and hydroelectric power plants like Old Hickory Lock and Dam in Tennessee and the Fort Randall Dam in South Dakota. It also allowed bank adjustments and re-directions for several rivers. The plan authorized the Secretary of War to regulate the surveillance of flood control and other improvements as well as the ability to call for a review of said surveys. The Secretary of Agriculture and the Department of Engineers were also charged with conducting surveys relating to their respective fields.

Budget 
The plan allocated $1,427,097,038 for the projects. The act also allotted a maximum of $1,000,000 annually to be used for removing debris and clearing channels, $2,000,000 to be used for rescue and repair of levees damaged by flooding, and $957,000,000 to be used for other miscellaneous actions.

Significant Projects 
 Flood protection in the Potomac River Basin and the construction of the Savage River Dam
 The construction of a reservoir in Rappahannock River Basin
 The construction of the Falling Spring Dam and a reservoir on the Jackson River
 The construction of four reservoirs in the Yadkin-Pee Dee River Basin
 Extensive improvements and the construction of levees on the tributaries of the lower Mississippi River
 The construction of the West Fork Reservoir on the West Fork River
 The construction of the Lucky Peak Reservoir on the Boise River

References
 http://www.industcards.com/hydro-usa-tn.htm 
 http://www.industcards.com/hydro-usa-ks-ne-dakotas.htm
 https://web.archive.org/web/20090109143345/http://www.swt.usace.army.mil/library/Omnibus%20Acts%20from%201938%20to%202000/acts.htm

1946 in the environment
1946 in law
1946